Madhawapur  is one ward out of 14 ward of hanuman nagar kangkalni municipality in  Saptari District in the province no 2 of south-eastern Nepal. It is located 4 km west of koshi barrage.At the time of the 2011 Nepal census it had a population of 5,730 people living in 1,252 individual households.

References

Populated places in Saptari District
VDCs in Saptari District